Matthias Martinius (Martini) (1572 – 30 December 1630) was a German Calvinist theologian and educator.

Life
He was born in Freienhagen, Waldeck and educated at Herborn Academy. He became court preacher at Dillenburg, and then taught at Herborn before moving to Emden in 1607.

From 1610 Martinius was the founding rector of the Gymnasium Illustre at Bremen. The teaching at Bremen influenced in particular Johannes Cocceius, student under Martinius and Ludwig Crocius.

At the Synod of Dort of 1618 Martinius was present as a representative of Bremen. He was involved in controversy with the Lutherans Balthasar Mentzer and Philipp Nicolai.

Views
Martinius and the Bremen academy played an important role in the later developments of covenant theology. His views as Calvinist were considered moderate, and anticipated hypothetical universalism. The Bremen delegation at Dort, together with the English delegates John Davenant and Samuel Ward, were conspicuous for arguing against the Gomarist line on doctrine. Martinius absented himself from a number of sessions, clashed with Gomarus, Abraham Scultetus and Sibrandus Lubbertus, and was close to walking out of the Synod. The Synod's preference for infralapsarianism has been attributed to Martinius.

Works
Lexicon philologicum
Idea Methodica et brevis encyclopaediae.

Notes

Further reading
 Gerhard Menk (1980), Kalvinismus und Pädagogik: Matthias Martinius (1572-1630) und der Einfluß der Herborner Hohen Schule auf Johann Amos Comenius

1572 births
1630 deaths
German Calvinist and Reformed theologians
17th-century German educators
Participants in the Synod of Dort
German male non-fiction writers